The gamma function is an important special function in mathematics. Its particular values can be expressed in closed form for integer and half-integer arguments, but no simple expressions are known for the values at rational points in general. Other fractional arguments can be approximated through efficient infinite products, infinite series, and recurrence relations.

Integers and half-integers
For positive integer arguments, the gamma function coincides with the factorial. That is,

and hence

and so on. For non-positive integers, the gamma function is not defined.

For positive half-integers, the function values are given exactly by

or equivalently, for non-negative integer values of :

where  denotes the double factorial. In particular,

{|
|-
|
|
|
|
|-
|
|
|
|
|-
|
|
|
|
|-
|
|
|
|
|}

and by means of the reflection formula,

{|
|-
|
|
|
|
|-
|
|
|
|
|-
|
|
|
|
|}

General rational argument
In analogy with the half-integer formula,

Numerically,

 
 
 
 
 
 .

As  tends to infinity,

where  is the Euler–Mascheroni constant and  denotes asymptotic equivalence.

The number  is related to the lemniscate constant  by

and it has been conjectured by Gramain that

where  is the Masser–Gramain constant , although numerical work by Melquiond et al. indicates that this conjecture is false.

This permits efficiently approximating the gamma function of rational arguments to high precision using quadratically convergent arithmetic–geometric mean iterations. For example:

In particular, where AGM() is the arithmetic–geometric mean, we have

Other formulas include the infinite products

and

and

Products 
Some product identities include:

 
 

In general:

Other rational relations include

and many more relations for  where the denominator d divides 24 or 60.

Gamma quotients with algebraic values must be "poised" in the sense that the sum of arguments is the same (modulo 1) for the denominator and the numerator.

A more sophisticated example:

Imaginary and complex arguments
The gamma function at the imaginary unit  gives , :

It may also be given in terms of the Barnes -function:

Curiously enough,  appears in the below integral evaluation:

Here  denotes the fractional part.

Because of the Euler Reflection Formula, and the fact that , we have an expression for the modulus squared of the gamma function evaluated on the imaginary axis:

The gamma function with other complex arguments returns

Other constants
The gamma function has a local minimum on the positive real axis

 

with the value

 .

Integrating the reciprocal gamma function along the positive real axis also gives the Fransén–Robinson constant.

On the negative real axis, the first local maxima and minima (zeros of the digamma function) are:

See also
Chowla–Selberg formula

References

 
 
 X. Gourdon & P. Sebah. Introduction to the Gamma Function
 S. Finch. Euler Gamma Function Constants
 
 
 
 
 

Gamma and related functions
Mathematical constants